Arthur Elkins (1880 – 1920) was an English professional footballer who played as a forward.

References

1880 births
1920 deaths
Footballers from Grimsby
English footballers
Association football forwards
Grimsby Town F.C. players
English Football League players